This is a list of prime ministers of Uzbekistan, from the establishment of the office in 1925 as the chairman of the Council of Ministers of the Uzbek SSR to the present day.

The current prime minister, Abdulla Aripov, he assumed the office on 14 December 2016.

List of prime ministers of Uzbekistan (1925–present)

Uzbek Soviet Socialist Republic (1924–1991)

Chairman of the Council of People's Commissars
Fayzulla Khodzhayev (17 February 1925 – 17 June 1937)
Abdullah Karimov (26 July – 1 October 1937)
Sultan Segizbayev (2 October 1937 – July 1938)
Abdudzhabar Abdurrakhmanov (23 July 1938 – 15 March 1946)

Chairmen of the Council of Ministers
Abdudzhabar Abdurrakhmanov (15 March 1946 – 21 August 1950)
Abdurrazak Mavlyanov (21 August 1950 – 18 May 1951)
Nuritdin Mukhitdinov (18 May 1951 – 7 April 1953) (1st time)
Usman Yusupov (7 April 1953 – 18 December 1954)
Nuritdin Mukhitdinov (18 December 1954 – 22 December 1955) (2nd time)
Sobir Kamolov (22 December 1955 – 30 December 1957)
Mansur Mirza-Akhmedov (30 December 1957 – 16 March 1959)
Arif Alimov (16 March 1959 – 27 September 1961)
Rahmankul Kurbanov (27 September 1961 – 25 February 1971)
Narmakhonmadi Khudayberdyev (25 February 1971 – 3 December 1984) 
Gayrat Kadyrov (3 December 1984 – 21 October 1989)
Mirakhat Mirkasimov (21 October 1989 – 24 March 1990)  
Shukrullo Mirsaidov (24 March – 1 November 1990)

Republic of Uzbekistan (1991–present)

Prime ministers

See also
List of leaders of Uzbekistan
President of Uzbekistan
Vice President of Uzbekistan

Uzbekistan
Politics of Uzbekistan
Government of Uzbekistan
 
1992 establishments in Uzbekistan